Log Cabin Church is a historic non-denominational church at 413 Progress Road in the hamlet of Progress in the town of Mayfield, Fulton County, New York. It was built in 1937 and is a 26 feet deep by 18 feet wide log structure constructed of white poplar logs laid horizontally.  Also on the property is a privy and a parish activities hall.

The Log Cabin Church was listed on the National Register of Historic Places in 1999.

References

External links

Churches on the National Register of Historic Places in New York (state)
Churches completed in 1937
Churches in Fulton County, New York
National Register of Historic Places in Fulton County, New York